The Thirteen Martyrs of Cavite were Filipino patriots in Cavite, Philippines who were executed by musketry on September 12, 1896, for cooperating with the Katipunan during the Philippine Revolution against Spain. The de facto capital city of Trece Martires in Cavite is named after them.

The martyrs

The Cavite Conspiracy
Shortly before the Katipunan was uncovered, Emilio Aguinaldo was planning to attack the Spanish arsenal at Fort San Felipe and he enlisted other Katipuneros to recruit enough men so they could overrun the Spanish garrison. Their meetings were held at the house of Cabuco.

Aguinaldo and the other Katipuneros agreed that they would arm the inmates of the provincial jail who were made to work at the garrison. The task of recruiting the inmates was given to Lapidario, who was also the warden of the provincial jail. Aguado was to supply Lapidario with money to buy arms.

According to their plan, the uprising would be signaled by fireworks from the warehouse of Inocencio. Other leaders of the uprising were Luciano, Conchu, Pérez, Pablo José, Marcos José, and Juan Castañeda.  The revolt was to start on September 1.

On August 26, Aguinaldo received a letter from Andrés Bonifacio who reported that a Katipunan assembly in Balintawak on August 24 decided to start the revolution on August 30, to be signaled by a blackout at the Luneta, then known as Bagumbayan. On the appointed day, Bonifacio and his men attacked the Spanish powder magazine in San Juan. Later that same day, the Spanish authorities declared martial law in Manila and the provinces of Cavite, Laguna, Batangas, Bulacan, Pampanga, Tarlac and Nueva Ecija.

Aguinaldo learned of the declaration of martial law in a meeting with Spanish Governor Fernando Pargas on the morning of August 31, 1896. He then went to Cabezas' haberdashery and asked him to inform Lapidario that they had no alternative but to rise in arms. Cabezas was the one who enlisted Lapidario for the planned uprising.

But Cabezas was not in favor of starting the revolt on August 31, 1896 so they discussed the uprising further. They decided to postpone the attack to September 3. However, the Spanish learned of the plan from a dressmaker named Victoriana Sayat and they immediately arrested Lapidario, de Ocampo and Aguado. The three were held incommunicado in the boat Ulloa and interrogated. They are presumed to have been tortured.

De Ocampo revealed the names of his companions and the thirteen suspects were rounded up on September 3 along with dozens of other Cavite leaders, including the musician Julián Felipe, who would compose the Philippine national anthem the following year. Felipe was incarcerated for nine months at Fort San Felipe. Also subsequently released were Pablo and Marcos José, and Juan Castañeda of Imus, who are also believed to have been involved in the uprising.

While awaiting trial, guilt-stricken de Ocampo tried to commit suicide by slashing his stomach with a piece of broken glass. However, he was included in the indictment for treason before a military court which found them guilty on September 11 after a four-hour trial.

At 12:45 p.m. the following day, the thirteen patriots were brought out of their cells and taken to the Plaza de Armas, outside Fort San Felipe, and executed by musketry. Their bodies were later buried in a common grave at the Catholic cemetery at the village of Caridad.

Later, the bodies of seven of the martyrs—Máximo Inocencio, Victorino Luciano, Francisco Osorio, Luis Aguado, Hugo Pérez, José Lallana, and Antonio San Agustín—were exhumed and reburied elsewhere. But the rest—Agapito Conchu, Máximo Gregorio, Alfonso de Ocampo, Eugenio Cabezas, Feliciano Cabuco, and Severino Lapidario remained unclaimed in their common grave.

In 1906, a monument to the Thirteen Martyrs was erected at the San Roque district of Cavite City, at the head of the San Roque causeway. Their families reinterred the remains of their loved ones at the foot of the monument.  The monument is located at the intersection of M. Valentin St., Lopez Jaena Rd, Zulueta Rd and the P. Burgos Ave.

Legacy 
In 1954, the capital of Cavite was transferred to a newly created city situated near the center of the province, and it was named Trece Mártires in their honor. Each of its 13 barangays were named for each of the martyrs. On May 24, 2004, a new monument of the thirteen patriots was inaugurated in Trece Martires near the City Hall.

See also
 Philippine Revolution
 Fifteen Martyrs of Bicol executed on January 4, 1897
 Thirteen Martyrs of Bagumbayan executed on January 11, 1897
 Nineteen Martyrs of Aklan executed on March 23, 1897

External links

 Thirteen Martyrs of Cavite Spanish book written by Jose Nava on the trial of the Thirteen Martyrs.

References
 National Historical Institute, Filipinos in History 5 vols. (Manila: National Historical Institute, 1995)

19th-century births
1896 deaths
Paramilitary Filipinos
13 Martyrs of Cavite
People of Spanish colonial Philippines
Executed Filipino people
People executed by Spain by firearm
History of the Philippines (1565–1898)
History of Cavite